Andrysiak is a Polish language surname from the personal name Andrew. Notable people with the name include:
 Lucyna Andrysiak (1955–2017), Polish politician
 Terry Andrysiak (1965), former American football quarterback

References 

Polish-language surnames
Surnames from given names